Trpeznica is a mountain peak forming part of the Šar Mountains in Kosovo and North Macedonia. The summit of Trpeznica is flat while its slopes are steep and sometimes rocky especially in the Kosovan side.

Notes and references

Notes:

References:

Mountains of Kosovo
Šar Mountains
Two-thousanders of Kosovo